Leroy Merlin is a French-headquartered home improvement  and gardening retailer serving several countries in Europe, Asia, South America, and Africa. Leroy Merlin is owned by the Mulliez family, which also owns Auchan.

History 

In 1923, Adolphe Leroy and Rose Merlin, associates in private and business life, opened a business of American surplus. Strengthened by this first success, they decided to sell DIY products and supplies at moderate prices. In 1960, the firm was named Leroy Merlin. It became a precursor, as it was the first company to offer free delivery services.

Generally established on the outskirts of major towns and cities, Leroy Merlin stores are large centres (9000 m2 on average) providing self-service and sales assisted services. Its business is centred on six main sectors: DIY, building, gardening, sanitary equipment, renewable energy, and interior decoration.

Controversies 
Following the 2022 Russian invasion of Ukraine, many international, particularly Western, companies pulled out of Russia. Leroy Merlin, however, on 11 March announced that it has no plans to reduce its operations in Russia, where it operates 143 stores. On 17 March they cut off the Ukrainian office from corporate communications and stated that they would increase supplies to the Russian Federation. 

Leroy Merlin has a strong presence in Russia and generates 18% of its turnover there. In 2020 the company paid $335 million in taxes as a result of their operations in Russia. The company has been criticized for making indirect contributions to the Russian military effort. 

On the night of 20-21 March 2022, a shopping centre in Kyiv housing a Leroy Merlin shop was bombed. Shop employees called on the company to leave Russia, as did the Ukrainian MP Oleksiy Honcharenko. The latter, elected in the constituency of Odessa and member of the Ukrainian delegation to the parliamentary assembly of the Council of Europe, broadcast a video. The video was shot in front of the devastated store.

In a statement to AFP, Adeo, Leroy Merlin's holding company, said a closure would be considered a "premeditated bankruptcy" and says that it has an "employer's responsibility towards (its) 45,000 employees and their families who have been contributing to the building of Leroy Merlin Russia for the past 18 years". However, there are reports of insults and threats from customers following the company's continued operations in Russia.

Business units 
 Aki
 Bricocentre
 Weldom

Renewable energy

Superstore installations
Spanish electricity utility Endesa has installed a 100 kW solar plant, covering 1700 m² with 670 photovoltaic panels, for Leroy Merlin at its superstore in Rivas Vaciamadrid, Spain.

See also 
 Home automation
 Organic garden
 Wood pellet

References

External links 
 

Superstores
Garden centres
Hardware stores
Retail companies established in 1923
French brands
Retail companies of Romania